Staroye Shaygovo (Sire Šäjgav; , Sire Šajgav) is a rural locality (a selo) and the administrative center of Staroshaygovsky District of the Republic of Mordovia, Russia. Population:

References

Notes

Sources

Rural localities in Mordovia
Staroshaygovsky District
Insarsky Uyezd